Boating is an American enthusiast magazine published by the Bonnier Corporation. 

The magazine was started in 1966 by Ziff Davis in Chicago, Illinois.

Publishers

References

External links
Official Website
Boating Course
Luxury Canal Cruise

Boating magazines
Bonnier Group
Magazines established in 1966
Magazines published in Chicago
Magazines published in Florida
1966 establishments in Illinois
Sports magazines published in the United States